Diospyros candolleana, is a tree in the Ebony family, endemic to the Western Ghats of India and Sri Lanka. The trees are usually 20m tall, and found as subcanopy trees in wet evergreen forests up to 90m.

Description

The bark of D. candolleana is smooth, dark, and blaze-reddish in color. Branchlets are terete and show adpressed hairs when young. Leaves are simple, alternate, distichous; petioles are 0.6-1.1 cm long and canaliculate. Leaves are hairy when young, and glabrous when mature. Lamina is about 6-18 x 3.5-7.5 cm in length, shape is oblong to elliptic-oblong.

Flowers are unisexual and dioecious. Inflorescence of Male flowers show axillary clusters on very short tubercles, silky tomentose; and female flowers are sessile, in axillary clusters.

Fruits are as berries and usually bear 4 seeds.

Uses

Use extensively in timber production. Timber is hard, and used in building constructions. A decoction of root-bark is used in rheumatism and swellings in traditional medicine.

References

External resources
http://pilikula.com/botanical_list/botanical_name_d/diospyros_candolleana.html
http://indiabiodiversity.org/species/show/10378

candelleana
Flora of India (region)
Flora of Sri Lanka